The women's team tennis event was part of the tennis programme and took place between October 3 and 6, at the Hiroshima Regional Park Tennis Stadium.

Schedule
All times are Japan Standard Time (UTC+09:00)

Results

Quarterfinals

Semifinals

Final

References 

Page 22
Page 24
Page 24

Women's team